One Hour Before Dawn (aka Behind Red Curtains) is a 1920 silent film mystery directed by Henry King, written by Fred Myton and starring H. B. Warner, Frank Leigh and Anna Q. Nilsson. It was produced by Jesse D. Hampton and released by Pathé Exchange.

Anna Q. Nilsson emigrated to Hollywood from Sweden in 1910 to become a silent film actress, but failed to make the transition to talkies. She made a total of 200 films., almost 50 of them sound. She never completely recovered from a fall from her horse at the beginning of the 30s, but was always in demand for smaller parts, among them Sunset Boulevard and Seven brides for seven brides, her last in 1954. When she died in 1974 several American television stations interrupted their programme to show clips from her films

Plot
When a hypnotist named Norman Osgood mesmerizes a man named Harrison Kirke without his consent, Kirke threatens to kill him. Afraid for his life, Osgood hypnotizes another man named George Clayton and tells him he must murder Mr. Kirke one hour before the arrival of the dawn. Kirke is found murdered the next day, and Clayton starts to believe he was the murderer. He is exonerated in the end, however, when the identity of the real murderer is discovered.

Cast
Frank Leigh - Norman Osgood
Howard Davies - Harrison Kirke
H. B. Warner - George Clayton
Anna Q. Nilsson - Ellen Aldrich
Augustus Phillips - Bob Manning
Adele Farrington - Mrs. Montague
Lillian Rich - Dorothy
Dorothy Hagan - Mrs. Copeland
Thomas Guise - Judge Copeland
Ralph McCullough - Fred Aldrich
Edmund Burns - Arthur
Wilton Taylor - Inspector Steele

Preservation status
A print exists at Bois d'Arcy in France.

References

External links

1920 films
American silent feature films
Films directed by Henry King
American black-and-white films
1920 mystery films
American mystery films
Pathé Exchange films
1920s American films
Silent mystery films